Adrian Samuel Young (born August 26, 1969) is an American drummer and member of the rock bands No Doubt and Dreamcar.

Biography
When not performing, in the studio or touring, Young likes to spend his time out on the golf course, as he is an avid golf player.  He is a scratch golfer who is a much desired participant in celebrity golf tournaments such as the Michael Jordan Invitational, Alice Cooper Foundation Tournament and others. Young has participated in VH1's Fairway to Heaven numerous times.

Reunion with No Doubt
No Doubt announced on their official website that they would tour in the summer of 2009 with Paramore, the Sounds, Janelle Monáe, Bedouin Soundclash, Katy Perry, and Panic! at the Disco. while finishing their upcoming album, which was set for release in 2010. Tickets for the tour went on sale March 7, 2009. As a special promotion for the tour, the band was giving away their entire music catalog free as a digital download with purchase of top tier seating.

In 2009, No Doubt made an appearance on the television series Gossip Girl, playing a fictional band called "Snowed Out" in the episode "Valley Girls". They performed their cover version of the Adam and the Ants song "Stand and Deliver".

Personal life
In October 1999, Young proposed to his girlfriend Nina Kent on stage during a No Doubt concert. They were married in January 2000. The couple had a son, Mason, in 2002 and a daughter, Magnolia, in 2011. He and his wife delivered their stillborn daughter, Ruby, in 2010. Young's two children have a cousin-like relationship with the other children of No Doubt band members, as the children often spend time together during concerts.

References

1969 births
Living people
American male drummers
American rock drummers
No Doubt members
Bow Wow Wow members
Musicians from Long Beach, California
20th-century American drummers
Dreamcar members